Pirate Hunter: Seize and Destroy is an action game created by Ascaron Entertainment UK Ltd and published by Encore, released in 2003 for Microsoft Windows.

Gameplay
The player plays a sailor in the Caribbean. The player can experience 16 different scenarios, 14 different ships, from a Sloop to a Ship-of-the-Line and many quests. The game features real-time sea battles and a top-down view that is similar to a RTS (Real Time Strategy) game.

Development
The game was originally set to be named Tortuga, but its name was changed during development to Piraten: Herrscher der Karibik (Pirates: Ruler of the Caribbean).

Reception
The game received a score of 72% from PC Gamer US.

References

2003 video games
Action-adventure games
Age of Discovery video games
Ascaron games
Single-player video games
Strategy video games
Trade simulation games
Video games about pirates
Video games developed in Germany
Video games set in the Caribbean
Windows games
Windows-only games